Argentina competed at the 2022 Winter Olympics in Beijing, China, from 4 to 20 February 2022.

The Argentinean team consisted of two men and four women competing in four sports. On January 25, 2022, alpine skier Francesca Baruzzi and cross-country skier Franco Dal Farra were named as the country's flagbearers during the opening ceremony. Meanwhile speed skater Maria Victoria Rodriguez was the flagbearer during the closing ceremony.

Competitors
The following is the list of number of competitors who participated at the Games per sport/discipline.

Alpine skiing

By meeting the basic qualification standards Argentina qualified one male and one female alpine skier.

Cross-country skiing

By meeting the basic qualification standards Argentina qualified one male and one female cross-country skier.

Distance

Sprint

Luge

Based on the results during the 2021–22 Luge World Cup season, Argentina qualified 1 sled in the women's singles.

Speed skating 

Argentina qualified one athlete in the women's 500 metres event through the 2021–22 ISU Speed Skating World Cup. This will mark the country's sport debut at the Winter Olympics.

Distance

Mass start

References

Nations at the 2022 Winter Olympics
2022
2022 in Argentine sport